Jordan Peele is an actor, comedian and filmmaker. He is known for his duo sketch group Key & Peele with Keegan-Michael Key. He has also directed Get Out (2017), Us (2019), and Nope (2022).

Film

As actor

As a filmmaker 

Executive producer
 Honk for Jesus. Save Your Soul. (2022)

Television

Music videos

References 

American filmographies
Director filmographies
Male actor filmographies
F